Len Le Ber is a former international lawn bowler who represented Guernsey.

Bowls career
Le Ber has represented Guernsey at the Commonwealth Games, in the fours at the 2002 Commonwealth Games in Manchester.

In 2007, he won the triples bronze medal at the Atlantic Bowls Championships. He retired from international competition following the 2007 medal.

He is a two times British champion after winning the 2009 triples and the 2013 fours titles, at the British Isles Bowls Championships.

Personal life
His son is Matt Le Ber.

References

Guernsey male bowls players
Living people
Bowls players at the 2002 Commonwealth Games
Year of birth missing (living people)